Okanghudi is a small settlement in the Ohangwena Region in Namibia,  which is noted for being the birthplace of Namibian former President Hifikepunye Pohamba.  The village has one school which comprises grades 1 to 10. The economy is based on substance farming.

References

Populated places in the Ohangwena Region